Deanna (Dea) Summers (May 30, 1940 in New Albany, MS – February 14, 2017 in Garland, TX) was an American songwriter born in Mississippi. The family relocated to Memphis, Tennessee in 1952 where she attended Kingsbury Jr. High School. She also attended Humes High School before her family relocated to Dallas, Texas.  She had been an active member of BMI (Broadcast Music Incorporated) as both a songwriter and publisher affiliate since 1965. She was co-owner of Silicon Music Publishing and many of her compositions have been recorded by various artists. Her songs and published works have appeared on Capri Records, Tear Drop Records, Charay Records, Mister Rock Records, Enviken Records, Le Cam Records, Country Disco Records, Rollercoaster Records, Primo Records, Crystal Clear Sound Records, Collector Records, Collectable Records, Big Beat Records, Lake County Records, Domino Records, Front Row Records, Maridene Records, Helvis Records, W&G Records, Overtone Records.

In 1977 she wrote "Goodbye Priscilla (Bye Bye Baby Blue)"  as a tribute to Elvis Presley and Priscilla Presley. The song was issued by Tear Drop Records in 1977 and became one of her most popular  compositions. The "Goodbye Priscilla" 45 is now a much sought-after collectible and has been issued on several Elvis "tribute" compilation albums and CDs. She later met with Priscilla Presley and personally presented her with a copy of the original 45rpm record. When "Goodbye Priscilla" was first released in 1977 there was some confusion about which Priscilla it was written for-Priscilla Presley or Priscilla Davis who was a main character in the famous Cullen Davis Murder Trials. In his book "Blood Will Tell-The Murder Trials Of Cullen Davis" author Gary Cartwright credits the song (page 199) as referring to Priscilla Davis. However, this song was written solely for Priscilla Presley as a tribute to Elvis.   
Summers was profiled in the Dictionary of International Biography (1982 Edition published by IBC Cambridge). She was also profiled in Songwriter's Market (1979–Present) published by Writer's Digest Books.

Deanna Summers was married to Rockabilly music star Gene Summers from 1961 until her death in 2017. They have three sons Dusty, Steve and Shawn.

Biography

Writer; Songwriter; Music Publisher. Career includes; Co-Founder, Silicon Music Publishers, 1965;  Secretary, Silicon Music/Domino Records;  First published work, "My Yearbook, 1965; Co-Founder, Domino Records, 1968; Co-Founder, Front Row Records, 1976; First commercial recordings as an artist, 1976 including "Ballad Of Moon Dog Mayne, 1976; "Do You Think I'm Sexy", 1979. Member, Broadcast Music. Inc. (writer and publisher affiliate), 1965–Present; European promotional tours, 1980–Present; Recorded works distributed worldwide; Compositions include: "Ballad Of Moondog Mayne"; "Baby Please Tell Me Why"; "Crazy Cat Corner"; ""Domino"; "Don't Let Me Down Baby"; "Goodbye Priscilla (Bye Bye Baby Blue)"; "Honey Your Mind's Working Overtime"; "Hot Pants"; "I Love A Mystery"; "Just Together"; "Long Story Song"; "My Yearbook"; "Rat Fink"; "Rockin' Fever"; "So"; "Still The Grand Ole Opry Queen"; "Who Stole The Marker (From The Grave Of Bonnie Parker)"; Co-Producer of  Domino/Front Row recording sessions; Honors include: Award, Silicon Music Publishers for Distribution and Outstanding Promotions Of "Grand Ole Opry Queen" from Pittman Publications, Alabama.

References

External links
 Deanna Summers Obituary (1940 - 2017) - Garland, TX - Dallas Morning News

Sources
BMI Repertoire Search (online)
Front-page article (published by The Garland Daily News), June 1, 1965, Texas
"Nashville Report" by Paul Perry (published by Record World Magazine, New York) July 6, 1968
WYNK-AM Radio, Baton Rouge, Louisiana (Jim Horn P.D.), August 31, 1968
Tuscaloosa News, May 3, 1970, Alabama
WESO-AM Radio, Oxford, Massachusetts, May 19, 1970
WNTC-AM Radio, Potsdam, New York, November 16, 1970
KGCP-AM Radio, Grafton, North Dakota, December 1, 1970
Disc Collector Magazine issue #35, January 1971 USA
"Bill Gavin's Personal Picks" (published by The Gavin Report), February 5, 1971 USA
"Newcomer Picks" (published by Cash Box Magazine, New York), February 13, 1971
"Nashville Scene" (published by Billboard Magazine, New York), April 3, 1971
"A Song On Hot Pants" (published by The Sun Newspaper, Melbourne, Australia), May 3, 1971
"DJ's Corner" by Bill Jones (published by The Music City News, Nashville), July 1971
Tuscaloosa News, September 13, 1971, Alabama
"Variety Talk" by Glen Kelly (published by Brite-Star News), May issue, 1971 USA
"Platta Chatta 'n Stuff" by H.V. Schreiner (published by Country Corner, New York), July 1971,
"Signings" (published by Billboard Magazine, N.Y.), April 7, 1979
"Showcase" (published by The Garland Daily News), August 28, 1980, Texas
Dictionary of International Biography  1982 Edition (published by IBC Cambridge) USA

1940 births
2017 deaths
Deaths from respiratory failure
Songwriters from Texas
Songwriters from Mississippi
Songwriters from Tennessee
American women composers
American female models
Women in publishing
People from New Albany, Mississippi
People from Dallas
People from Garland, Texas
People from Memphis, Tennessee
Humes High School alumni
Garland High School alumni
20th-century American composers
21st-century American composers
20th-century American women musicians
21st-century American women musicians
20th-century women composers
21st-century women composers